The rubrospinal tract is a part of the nervous system. It is a part of the lateral indirect extra-pyramidal tract.

Structure
In the midbrain, it originates in the magnocellular red nucleus, crosses to the other side of the midbrain, and descends in the lateral part of the brainstem tegmentum.
In the spinal cord, it travels through the lateral funiculus of the spinal cord, coursing adjacent to the lateral corticospinal tract.

Function
In humans, the rubrospinal tract is one of several major motor control pathways.  It is smaller and has fewer axons than the corticospinal tract, suggesting that it is less important in motor control.  It is one of the pathways for the mediation of involuntary movement, along with other extra-pyramidal tracts including the vestibulospinal, tectospinal, and reticulospinal tracts. The tract is responsible for large muscle movement regulation flexor and inhibiting extensor tone as well as fine motor control. It terminates primarily in the cervical and thoracic portions of the spinal cord, suggesting that it functions in upper limb but not in lower limb control. 

It is small and rudimentary in humans.  In some other primates, however, experiments have shown that over time, the rubrospinal tract can assume almost all the duties of the corticospinal tract when the corticospinal tract is lesioned.

See also
 Upper motor neuron

References

External links
 

Spinal cord tracts
Motor system